Oddný Eir Ævarsdóttir (born 1972) is an Icelandic writer. She has written three autobiographical novels, her best-known work being Jarðnæði (Land of love; plan of ruins) which was nominated for the Icelandic Literary Award in 2011 and which won the 2012 Icelandic Women's Literature Prize and the 2014 EU Prize for Literature.

Life
Oddny Eir has a PhD from Sorbonne University. She runs a publishing company Apaflasa in collaboration with her brother the archaeologist Uggi Ævarsson.

Works
Ways in between : Gudbjörg Lind, Gudrun Kristjansdottir, Kristin Jonsdottir = Leidin a milli, Reykjavik : Þjóðminjasafns Íslands,  2007, 
 Land of love and ruins, Brooklyn, NY : Restless Books, 2016. ,

References

Icelandic writers
1972 births
Living people
University of Paris alumni